Serhiy Oleksandrovych Shaptala (born 5 February 1973) is the Ukrainian Chief of the General Staff (since 28 July 2021), holding the rank of Lieutenant general.

In 2015, he was awarded Hero of Ukraine by President Petro Poroshenko for his command of the 128th Brigade during the Battle of Debaltseve.

During the 2022 Russian invasion of Ukraine, Shaptala said Ukrainian air defences shot down a Russian Il-76, and shared video footage of a Ukrainian Bayraktar TB2 striking Russian targets.

References

1973 births
Living people
People from Cherkasy Oblast
Chiefs of the General Staff (Ukraine)
Recipients of the Order of Gold Star (Ukraine)
Lieutenant generals of Ukraine
Ukrainian military personnel of the 2022 Russian invasion of Ukraine